The inhabitants of Latin America are from a variety of ancestries, ethnic groups and races, making the region one of the most diverse in the world. The specific composition of the group varies from country to country. Many have a predominance of European-Amerindian or Mestizo population; in others, Amerindians are a majority; some are dominated by inhabitants of European ancestry; and some countries' populations have large African or Mulatto populations.

Overview

According to Jon Aske:

Aske has also written that:

In his famous 1963 book The Rise of the West, William Hardy McNeill wrote that:

Thomas C. Wright, meanwhile, has written that:

Ethnic groups
 Amerindians: The indigenous population of Latin America, the Amerindians, arrived  during the Lithic stage. In post-Columbian times they experienced tremendous population decrease, particularly in the early decades of colonization. They have since recovered in numbers, surpassing sixty million by some estimates. With the growth of other groups, they now compose a majority only in Bolivia and Guatemala, and nearly a half of Peru's population. Mexico (around one fifth of national population) has the largest Amerindian population in the Americas in absolute numbers. Most of the remaining countries have Amerindian minorities, in every case making up less than one-tenth of the respective country's population. In many countries, people of mixed Amerindian and European ancestry make up the majority of the population.
 Asians: People of Asian descent number several million in Latin America. The first Asians to settle in the region were Filipino, as a result of Spain trading in Asia and the Americas. The majority of Asian Latin Americans are of Japanese or Chinese ancestry and reside mainly in Brazil and Peru; there is also a growing Chinese minority in Panama and Mexico. Brazil is home to about two million people of Asian descent; this includes the largest ethnic Japanese community outside Japan itself (estimated as high as 1.5 million), and about 200,000 ethnic Chinese and 100,000 ethnic Koreans. Ethnic Koreans also number tens of thousands in Argentina and Mexico. 
 Blacks: Millions of Africans were brought to Latin America from the 16th century onward, the majority of whom were sent to the Caribbean region and Brazil. Among the Latin American nations, Brazil leads this category in relative and absolute numbers, with 39% of the population being of at least partial Afro-Latin American descent. Significant populations are also found in Dominican Republic, Puerto Rico, Colombia, Cuba, Panama, Ecuador, Peru, Venezuela, Honduras, and Costa Rica. Latin Americans of mixed Black and White ancestry, called Mulattoes, are more numerous than Blacks. However, sometimes mulattos are included in the 'black' category, while other times they form their own ethnicity.
 Mestizos: Intermixing between Europeans and Amerindians began early in the colonial period and was extensive. The resulting people, known as Mestizos (Caboclos in Brazil), make up the majority of the population in half of the countries of Latin America, making Paraguay one of the lead countries. Additionally, Mestizos compose large minorities in nearly all the other mainland countries.
 Mulattoes: Mulattoes are people of mixed African and European ancestry. In Latin America, Mulattoes descend primarily from Spanish or Portuguese men on one side, and enslaved African women on the other. Brazil is home to Latin America's largest mulatto population. Mulattoes are a population majority in the Dominican Republic and, depending on the source, Cuba as well. Mulattoes are also large in Venezuela, Panama, Honduras, Colombia, Costa Rica and Puerto Rico.
 Whites: Beginning in the late 15th century, large numbers of Iberian colonists settled in what became Latin America. The Portuguese colonized Brazil primarily, and the Spaniards settled elsewhere in the region. At present, most White Latin Americans are of Spanish, Portuguese, and Italian ancestry.  Iberians brought the Spanish and Portuguese languages, the Catholic faith, and many Iberian-Latin traditions. Brazil, Argentina, Paraguay, Chile, Colombia, and Venezuela contain the largest absolute numbers of Whites in Latin America. Self-identified populations of whites make up the majorities of Argentina, Chile, Costa Rica, Cuba, and Uruguay, and nearly half of Brazil's population. Ever since most of Latin America gained independence in the 1810s–1820s, millions of people have immigrated there. Of these immigrants, Italians formed the largest group, and next were Spaniards and Portuguese. Many others arrived, such as French, Germans, Greeks, Poles, Ukrainians, Russians, Croats, Estonians, Latvians, Lithuanians, Irish, and Welsh. Also included are Jews, as well as Arabs of Lebanese, Syrian, and Palestinian descent; most of them are Christian. Whites presently compose the largest racial group in Latin America (36% in the table herein) and, whether as White, Mestizo, or Mulatto, the vast majority of Latin Americans have white ancestry.
 Zambos: Intermixing between Africans and Amerindians was especially prevalent in Brazil and Middle America, often due to slaves running away (becoming cimarrones: maroons) and being taken in by Amerindian villagers. In Spanish speaking nations, people of this mixed ancestry are known as Garifunas in Central America, Lobos in Mexico, and Cafuzos in Brazil.

According to Lizcano
The following table contains information based on a 2014 non-genetic work entitled "Composición Étnica de las Tres Áreas Culturales del Continente Americano al Comienzo del Siglo XXI" ("Ethnic Composition of the Three Cultural Areas of the American Continent at the Beginning of the 21st Century") by National Autonomous University of Mexico professor Francisco Lizcano Fernández.

Lizcano compiled his estimation of groups based on criteria of cultural patterns, not on genotypes nor even phenotype. In these estimations, therefore, "whites" encompasses all those whose practiced culture is predominantly Iberian-derived, while "mestizos" encompasses those whose practiced culture noticeably mixes Iberian and Amerindian cultural traditions, and "Amerindians" only those whose practiced culture is predominantly indigenous.

The resulting effect of employing these criteria, therefore, skews the figure of said groups if they had been based on genetic factors, or even based on phenotypic factors. Thus, for instance, the estimate of "whites" given for Chile would include mostly genetic mestizos, while the estimate of "mestizos" in Mexico would include not only a significant proportion of genetic Amerindians, but also many genetic whites, and so on for other countries.

Note: "Creoles" refer to people of African descent originated in British and French colonies.

According to Latinobarometro
The following table shows how Latin Americans answer the question What race do you consider yourself to belong to? in the Latinobarometro survey.

According to other sources
This is a list of ethnic groups based on national or other sources.

Genetic studies

Skin pigmentation

In Latin America, human skin color and ancestry are often conflated, with lighter skin commonly assumed as indicative of higher levels of European ancestry. A 20th century study on Mexican Americans used skin reflectance data (a method of measuring the lightness or darkness of skin) as an estimation of European ancestry. However, genetic evidence published in 2019 has challenged this presumption. A genome-wide association study of 6000 Latin Americans from Mexico, Brazil, Colombia, Chile and Peru found that the strongest correlation for light skin color in these populations was actually an amino acid variant of the MFSD12 gene; which is absent in Europeans, but very common in East Asians and Native Americans. The old presumption that lighter skin in Latin Americans is an indicator of European ancestry was unjustified.

Argentina

Genetically, the composition of Argentina is mostly European in ancestry, with both Native American and African contributions.

A 2009 autosomal DNA study found that of the total Argentine population, 78.5 percent of the national genepool was European, 17.3 percent Native American, and 4.2 percent African.

An unweighted autosomal study of blood donors from 2012 found the following composition among samples in four regions of Argentina:  65% European, 31% Native American and 4% African. The study's conclusion was not to achieve a generalized autosomal average of the country, but rather the existence of genetic heterogeneity among differing sample regions.

 Homburguer et al., 2015, PLOS One Genetics: 67% European, 28% Amerindian, 4% African and 1,4% Asian.
 Avena et al., 2012, PLOS One Genetics: 65% European, 31% Amerindian, and 4% African.
 Buenos Aires Province: 76% European and 24% others.
 South Zone (Chubut Province): 54% European and 46% others.
 Northeast Zone (Misiones, Corrientes, Chaco & Formosa provinces): 54% European and 46% others.
 Northwest Zone (Salta Province): 33% European and 67% others.
 Oliveira, 2008, on Universidade de Brasília: 60% European, 31% Amerindian and 9% African.
 National Geographic: 52% European, 27% Amerindian ancestry, 9% African and 9% others.

Brazil
Genetic studies have shown the Brazilian population as a whole to have European, African and Native American components.

An autosomal study from 2013, with nearly 1300 samples from all of the Brazilian regions, found a predominant degree of European ancestry combined with African and Native American contributions, in varying degrees. 'Following an increasing North to South gradient, European ancestry was the most prevalent in all urban populations (with values up to 74%). The populations in the North consisted of a significant proportion of Native American ancestry that was about two times higher than the African contribution. Conversely, in the Northeast, Center-West and Southeast, African ancestry was the second most prevalent. At an intrapopulation level, all urban
populations were highly admixed, and most of the variation in ancestry proportions was observed between individuals within each population rather than among population'.

An  autosomal DNA study (2011), with nearly 1000 samples from all over the country ("whites", "pardos" and "blacks", according to their respective proportions), found a major European contribution, followed by a high African contribution and an important Native American component. "In all regions studied, the European ancestry was predominant, with proportions ranging from 60.6% in the Northeast to 77.7% in the South". The 2011 autosomal study samples came from blood donors (the lowest classes constitute the great majority of blood donors in Brazil), and also public health institutions' personnel and health students. The study showed that Brazilians from different regions are more homogenous than previously thought by some based on the census alone. "Brazilian homogeneity is, therefore, a lot greater between Brazilian regions than within Brazilian regions".

According to a DNA study from 2010, "a new portrayal of each ethnicity contribution to the DNA of Brazilians, obtained with samples from the five regions of the country, has indicated that, on average, European ancestors are responsible for nearly 80% of the genetic heritage of the population. The variation between the regions is small, with the possible exception of the South, where the European contribution reaches nearly 90%. The results, published by the scientific magazine American Journal of Human Biology by a team of the Catholic University of Brasília, show that in Brazil, physical indicators such as skin colour, colour of the eyes and colour of the hair have little to do with the genetic ancestry of each person, which has been shown in previous studies (regardless of census classification). "Ancestry informative SNPs can be useful to estimate individual and population biogeographical ancestry. Brazilian population is characterized by a genetic background of three parental populations (European, African, and Brazilian Native Amerindians) with a wide degree and diverse patterns of admixture. In this work we analyzed the information content of 28 ancestry-informative SNPs into multiplexed panels using three parental population sources (African, Amerindian, and European) to infer the genetic admixture in an urban sample of the five Brazilian geopolitical regions. The SNPs assigned apart the parental populations from each other and thus can be applied for ancestry estimation in a three hybrid admixed population. Data was used to infer genetic ancestry in Brazilians with an admixture model. Pairwise estimates of F(st) among the five Brazilian geopolitical regions suggested little genetic differentiation only between the South and the remaining regions. Estimates of ancestry results are consistent with the heterogeneous genetic profile of Brazilian population, with a major contribution of European ancestry (0.771) followed by African (0.143) and Amerindian contributions (0.085). The described multiplexed SNP panels can be useful tool for bioanthropological studies but it can be mainly valuable to control for spurious results in genetic association studies in admixed populations". It is important to note that "the samples came from free of charge paternity test takers, thus as the researchers made it explicit: "the paternity tests were free of charge, the population samples involved people of variable socioeconomic strata, although likely to be leaning slightly towards the ‘‘pardo’’ group".

An autosomal DNA study from 2009 found a similar profile: "all the Brazilian samples (regions) lie more closely to the European group than to the African populations or to the Mestizos from Mexico".

A 2015 autosomal genetic study, which also analysed data of 25 studies of 38 different Brazilian populations concluded that: European ancestry accounts for 62% of the heritage of the population, followed by the African (21%) and the Native American (17%). The European contribution is highest in Southern Brazil (77%), the African highest in Northeast Brazil (27%) and the Native American is the highest in Northern Brazil (32%).

According to another autosomal DNA study from 2008, by the University of Brasília (UnB), European ancestry dominates in the whole of Brazil (in all regions), accounting for 65.90% of heritage of the population, followed by the African contribution (24.80%) and the Native American (9.3%).

São Paulo state, the most populous state in Brazil, with about 40 million people, showed the following composition, according to an autosomal study from 2006: European genes account for 79% of the heritage of the people of São Paulo, 14% are of African origin, and 7% Native American. A more recent study, from 2013, found the following composition in São Paulo state: 61.9% European, 25.5% African and 11.6% Native American.

Chile

According to 1994 genetic research based on blood types, by Ricardo Cruz-Coke and Rodrigo Moreno, Chilean genetic admixture consists of 64% European, 35% Amerindian, and 1% African ancestry. The European admixture goes from 81% in East Santiago to 61% in West Santiago. Valparaiso (Chilean central coast) and Concepción (central southern Chile) have 77% and 75% of European genetic admixture respectively.

An autosomal DNA study from 2014 found the Chilean overall national genepool to be 44.34% (± 3.9%) Native American contribution, 51.85% (± 5.44%) European contribution, and 3.81% (± 0.45%) African contribution. The samples came from all the 15 regions of Chile, and they were collected in Arica, as the researchers made it clear: "Beginning 2011, 923 volunteers from all 15 regions of Chile, living temporarily or permanently in Arica, with an average age of 28.05 ± 9.37 and belonging to social classes A and B (4%), CA and CB (60%) and D (36%) were invited to participate on this study".

A 2015 autosomal DNA study found Chile to be 55.16% European, 42.38% Native American and 2.44% African (using LAMP-LD) and 43.22% Native American, 54.38% European and 2.40% African (using RFMix).

Another 2015 autosomal DNA study carried out in two public hospitals found Chile to be 57.20% European, 38.70% Native American and 2.5% African.

A 2020 autosomal DNA arrived at the following conclusion: "The country’s average ancestry was 0.53 ± 0.14 European, 0.04 ± 0.04 African, and 0.42 ± 0.14 Amerindian, disaggregated into 0.18 ± 0.15 Aymara and 0.25 ± 0.13 Mapuche. However, Mapuche ancestry was highest in the south (40.03%) and Aymara in the north (35.61%) as expected from the historical location of these ethnic groups".

Chilean  mitochondrial DNA and Y-chromosome studies indicate mostly Native American haplogroups on the maternal side and European haplogroups on the paternal side.

Colombia

Public Library of Science (PLOS) genetic research determined that  the average Colombian (of all races) has a mixture of European 62.5%, native Amerindian 27.4% , African 9.2% and East Asian 0.9%.

An autosomal study found the following composition to be the contribution to the national genepool: 57.6% European, 31.8% Native, and 10.6% Subsaharan African.

This list shows the regional admixture in Colombia according to a 2016 DNA study with nearly 800 samples:

Costa Rica

While the majority of Costa Ricans identify as of criollo or castizo descent, genetic studies demonstrate considerable pre-Columbian Amerindian and a smaller African ancestry.

According to an autosomal study, the genetic makeup of Costa Rica is 61% percent European, 30% percent Amerindian and 9% percent African. Regional variation was observed, with greater European influence in the northern (66%) and central (65%) regions . Increased Amerindian ancestry was found in the south (38%), and a higher African contribution in coastal regions (14% in the Pacific and 13% in the Atlantic).

The Central Valley—where more than half of Costa Ricans live—has a mestizo population with one of the highest European components in Latin America (comparable to Rio de la Plata), areas with low pre-Columbian Native ancestry (then occupied by heterogeneous groups of hunter-gatherers) and where the current Native population is sparse. During the Spanish colonization of the Americas, Costa Rica was one of the more isolated regions in the Americas. According to genetic studies, the average Costa Rican from the Central Valley is 67 percent European, 29 percent Native and 4 percent Subsaharan African.

Cuba

An autosomal study from 2014 has found the genetic ancestry in Cuba to be 72% European, 20% African and 8% Native American.

Dominican Republic
According to a recent autosomal study, the genetic composition of the Dominican Republic was 51.2 percent European, 41.8 percent African and 8 percent Native.

Ecuador
According to a 2010 DNA autosomal study, the genetic composition of genepool of Ecuadorians is 53.9% Native American, 38.8% European, and 7.3% African.

Another genetic study shows Ecuadorias are 64.6% Native American, 31.0% European, and 4.4% African.

According to a 2015 DNA autosomal study, the composition of Ecuador is: 50.1% Native American, 40.8% European, 6.8% African and 2.3% Asian.

El Salvador

A large majority of the population is declared mestizos. El Salvador is one of the most homogeneous countries in Latin America. According to a genetic research from 2015, Salvadoran genetic admixture is 46% from European contribution, 44% form Amerindian contribution, and 10% from African contribution. The genetic study "Genetic Components in America's demography" revealed a similar genetic mix and genetic makeup, with 52% European component, 40% Amerindian component, 6% African and 2% Arab.

According to the study Population data for 12 Y-chromosome STR loci in a sample from El Salvador, the study revealed that the population of El Salvador was closer to the European conglomerate (composed of European and South American general population samples from Brazil, Argentina, Colombia and Venezuela) than to the group of native and mestizo populations of Central and South America, which can be explained by the differences in the proportion of European contributions versus Amerindian in these population groups.

Guatemala 
The study "Geographic Patterns of Genome Admixture in Latin American Mestizos" by PLoS Genetics found that the composition of Guatemala were 55% Amerindian, 41% European, and 4% African into Ladinos (mestizo and white people), for the Ethnic Amerindians were 92% Amerindian and 8% European.

Mexico

A study in Mexico City found that its mestizo population had the greatest variation in Latin America, with its mestizos being either largely European or Amerindian rather than having a uniform admixture. The study's results are similar to those by INMEGEN in which the European admixture is 56.8 percent, followed by Asian (Native American) ancestry with 39.8 percent and an African contribution of 3.4 percent. 
Additional studies suggest a correlation between greater European admixture with a higher socioeconomic status, and greater Amerindian ancestry with a lower socioeconomic status. A study of low-income Mexicans found the mean admixture to be 0.590, 0.348 and 0.062 Amerindian, European and African respectively, while a study of Mexicans with an income higher than the mean found their European admixture to be 82 percent. On average, 68 haplotypes account for 95% of the chromosomes in Mexicans.

Peru
According to genetic research by the University of Brasilia, Peruvian genetic admixture consists of 73.0% Amerindian, 15.1% European, and 11.9% African ancestry.

According to a 2015 DNA autosomal study, the composition of Peru is: 68.3% Native American, 26.0% European, 3.2% African and 2.5% Asian.

Uruguay
A 2009 DNA study in the American Journal of Human Biology showed the genetic contribution to the genepool of Uruguay as a whole is primarily derived from Europe, with Native American ancestry ranging from 1 to 10 percent and African from 7 to 15 percent (depending on region). A 2014 study, "in agreement with those obtained from a study using nDNA", put the average "for the whole country" (but which thus may vary region-wise) as 6% African and 10% Native American.

See also
 Race and ethnicity in Latin America

References

 
Latin American people by ethnic or national origin
Latin America